Gyrðir Elíasson (born 4 April 1961) is an author and translator in Iceland.

Life and Literary Career
Gyrðir was born in Reykjavík, but was raised in Sauðarkrókur, a small town in the northern part of the country. He graduated from the Fjölbrautarskóli Nordurlands Vestra in Saudárkrókur in 1982. While trying various academic options at universities of education, he began writing poetry. His first book, a collection of poetry titled Svarthvít axlabönd (Black-and-White Suspenders), was published in 1983.

He also began translating works into Icelandic, considering it the duty of Icelandic writers to give a hand in translations. Among his translations are four works by Richard Brautigan. He also has an interest in works about the indigenous peoples of the Americas.

Gyrðir has written ten volumes of poetry and five books of prose. His style is called "highly personal" among other things.

Gyrðir lives in Reykjavík. He is married with three children.

Gallery
Gyrðir Elíasson visiting Aarhus, Denmark (2011)

Awards
Gyrðir won the prestigious Nordic Council's Literature Prize in 2011 for the short story collection Milli trjánna (Between the Trees). His collection The Yellow House was awarded both the Icelandic Literary Prize and the Halldór Laxnes Prize for Literature in 2000.

Works

Works translated to English
The Wandering Squirrel (Gangandi íkorni) (novel)
The Book of Sandá River (Sandárbókin) (novel)
Stone Tree ("Steintré") (short stories, 2003)
A Few General Remarks on the Cooling of the Sun (Nokkur almenn orð um kulnun sólar) (poetry)

Works translated to Icelandic
"The Education of Little Tree" by Forrest Carter (novel) (Icelandic: "Uppvöxtur Litla Trés")

References

External links
Bokmenntir authors listed under "G", Elíasson being the bottom name
About his poetical works (spanish and french)

Eliasson, Gyrdir
Gyrdir Eliasson
Eliasson, Gyrdir
Nordic Council Literature Prize winners